"Drag the Waters" is a song by the American heavy metal band Pantera. It first appeared on the 1996 album The Great Southern Trendkill, and later on the band's compilation album, The Best of Pantera: Far Beyond the Great Southern Cowboys' Vulgar Hits!.

Background
Pantera guitarist Dimebag Darrell has said that this song "is about a lifetime of dealing with people that you can't tell what they're really comin' at you for, or what their motives really are. You've got to drag the waters to get to the bottom and find out the truth."

Music video
The music video starts with a warning by a voice saying, "In everyday life, there is more than meets the eye. To reach the depths of truth, we must drag the waters."

This song is the first single released from the album, and the only one to have a music video. The video was directed by Darrell.

Reception
Metal Hammer ranked "Drag the Waters" No. 18 on their list of the 50 best Pantera songs.
 
Guitar World ranked "Drag the Waters" No. 8 on their ranking of the 25 greatest Pantera songs.

References

1996 singles
Pantera songs
Song recordings produced by Terry Date
Songs written by Dimebag Darrell
Songs written by Vinnie Paul
Songs written by Phil Anselmo
Songs written by Rex Brown
1996 songs